Actinium(III) fluoride (AcF3) is an inorganic compound, a salt of actinium and fluorine.

Synthesis 
Actinium fluoride can be prepared in solution or by a solid-state reaction. In the first method, actinium hydroxide is treated with hydrofluoric acid and the product precipitates:

Ac(OH)3 + 3HF -> AcF_3(v) + 3H2O

In the solid-state reaction, actinium metal is treated with hydrogen fluoride gas at 700 °C in a platinum crucible.

Properties 
Actinium fluoride is a white solid that reacts with ammonia at 900–1000 °C to yield an actinium oxyfluoride:
AcF3 + 2NH3 + H2O -> AcOF + 2NH4F

While lanthanum oxyfluoride is easily formed by heating lanthanum fluoride in air, a similar treatment merely melts actinium fluoride and does not yield AcOF.

References

Actinium compounds
Fluorides
Actinide halides